Helland is a Norwegian surname which may refer to:

Amund Helland  (1846–1918), Norwegian geologist, politician and non-fiction writer
Bjørn Helland-Hansen  (1877–1957), Norwegian pioneer in the field of modern oceanography 
Eric Helland, American Professor of Economics at Claremont McKenna College
Erik Jonsson Helland  (1816–1868), Norwegian Hardanger fiddle maker from Bø in Telemark  
Gunleik Jonsson Helland  (1828–1863),  Norwegian Hardanger fiddle maker from Bø in Telemark.
Gunnar Gunnarsson Helland  (1885–1976), Norwegian-American Hardanger fiddle maker 
Gunnar Olavsson Helland  (1852–1938), Norwegian Hardanger fiddle maker from Bø in Telemark 
Ingolv Helland, Norwegian portraitist who has an international reputation 
John Gunnarsson Helland  (1897–1977), Norwegian Hardanger fiddle maker from Bø in Telemark 
Jon Eriksson Helland  (1790–1862), Norwegian Hardanger violin maker from Bø in Telemark
Jon Eriksson Helland II (1849–1869), Norwegian Hardanger fiddle maker from Bø in Telemark 
Kjell Helland, Norwegian politician for the Labour Party 
Knut Eriksson Helland (1851–1880), Norwegian Hardanger fiddle maker from Bø in Telemark, Norway
Knut Gunnarsson Helland  (1880–1920), Norwegian-American Hardanger fiddle maker
Kristian Helland, Norwegian politician from the Christian Democratic Party 
Olav Gunnarsson Helland (1875–1946), Norwegian Hardanger fiddle maker from Bø in Telemark  
Pål André Helland, Norwegian football player
Roger Helland, Norwegian football (soccer) player 
Sverre Helland (1924–2007), Norwegian politician for the Centre Party 
Thor Helland, Norwegian long-distance runner

See also
Helland (fiddle makers)
Helland House, Norway, named after Peter Helland (1847–1935)

Norwegian-language surnames